William Root (March 6, 1934 – July 30, 2013) was an American jazz tenor and baritone saxophonist.

Early life 
Root was raised in a musical family; his father played drums in Philadelphia ensembles.

Career 
Root began playing professionally in the early 1950s, with Roy Eldridge, Hal McIntyre, Red Rodney, Bennie Green, and Buddy Rich. Later in the decade he worked extensively with Stan Kenton, Dizzy Gillespie, Hank Mobley, Lee Morgan, and Curtis Fuller. As a member of a Philadelphia-based sextet, Root's live recordings with trumpeter Clifford Brown ultimately became the second half of Brown's album The Beginning and the End.

He led his own ensembles from the late 1950s. In the 1960s he performed with Al Grey and Dakota Staton, and in 1968 settled in Las Vegas, where he played live in casinos for the next two decades. He recorded one album as leader, Live at Capozzoli's with trumpeter Vinnie Tanno, in 1999. Critic Steve Leowy noted that, "[w]hether lobbing shells or just playing it straight, Root and Tanno show the vibrancy and verve reminiscent of an earlier, innocent era, when joyous passion permeated every note."

Discography
 Clifford Brown, The Beginning and the End (Columbia, 1973)
 Dizzy Gillespie, Dizzy in Greece (Verve, 1957) 
 Dizzy Gillespie, Birk's Works (Verve, 1958)
 Bennie Green, Soul Stirrin' (Blue Note, 1958)
 Al Grey, Dizzy Atmosphere (Speciality, 1957)
 Stan Kenton, Cuban Fire! (Capitol, 1956)
 Stan Kenton, Kenton Live from the Las Vegas Tropicana (Capitol, 1961)
 Hank Mobley, Monday Night at Birdland (Roulette, 1959) 
 Hank Mobley, Another Monday Night at Birdland (Roulette, 1959) 
 Red Rodney, Red Rodney Returns (Argo, 1959) 
 Jack Sheldon, Jack's Groove (GNP, 1961)

References

American jazz saxophonists
American male saxophonists
Musicians from Philadelphia
Jazz musicians from Pennsylvania
American male jazz musicians